Aminatou Echard (born 1973) is a French filmmaker, best known for her 2018 documentary film, Jamilia.

Biography 
Echard was born in 1973 in Les Lilas, France. She went on to study Music, Performing Arts and Film Studies in Paris and Bologna.

Filmography 

 Jamilia (2018)
 (Marco) (2014)
 Broadway (2011)

References

External links 

 
 

1973 births
French women film directors
People from Les Lilas
Living people